This article contains Chinese Basketball Association records for individual and for team performances.

Individual highs 
This is a list of individual records separated into three categories — single game, single season, and career.Records last updated and confirmed on October 31, 2019, one day before the 2019–20 CBA season started.

Single game

Single season

Career

Team records 
This is a list of team records separated into four categories — single game, single season, single season plus postseason, and across seasons.

Single game 
 Longest game
 The longest CBA game was the Fujian Sturgeons beating the Zhejiang Golden Bulls 178–177 on 2014 February 09 in 5 overtimes.
 Most points in a game
 178 by Fujian Sturgeons (vs. 177 by Zhejiang Golden Bulls on 2014 February 09 in 5 overtimes).
 Most combined points in a game
 355 - Fujian Sturgeons (178) vs. Zhejiang Golden Bulls (177) on 2014 February 09 in 5 overtimes.

Single season 
 Most Victories (regular-season Only)
 45 by Guangdong Southern Tigers in 2008–09 CBA season (Overall 45-5 Record)
 Most Consecutive Victories (regular-season Only)
 26 by Guangdong Southern Tigers in 2014–15 CBA season (Nov. 28 until Jan. 30)
 Best Winning Percentage (regular-season Only)
 1.000 (22-0) by Bayi Rockets in 1995–96 CBA season (Then went 4-0 in Playoffs)

Single season & postseason 
 Most Victories (regular-season + Playoffs Combined)
 55 by Guangdong Southern Tigers in 2008–09 CBA season (Overall 55-6 Record)
 Most Consecutive Victories (regular-season + Playoffs Combined)
 26 by Bayi Rockets in 1995–96 CBA season (Start of season until end of Playoffs)
 26 by Guangdong Southern Tigers in 2014–15 CBA season (Nov. 28 until Jan. 30)
 Best Winning Percentage (regular-season + Playoffs Combined)
 1.000 (26-0) by Bayi Rockets in 1995–96 CBA season (Went 22-0 followed by 4-0)

Across seasons 
 Most Consecutive Victories (regular-season Only)
 30 by the Bayi Rockets from the start of the 1995–96 CBA season until losing in the ninth game of the 1996–97 CBA season (1996 December 25)
 Most Consecutive Victories (regular-season + Playoffs Combined)
 34 by the Bayi Rockets from the start of the 1995–96 CBA season until losing in the ninth game of the 1996–97 CBA season (1996 December 25)
(Note: Bayi won 4 playoff games in 1995–96, and had joined the CBA holding a 14-game streak, so the team's overall spree reached 48 games)

References

records